"We R in Need of a Musical Revolution" is a song by Canadian singer/songwriter Esthero. It was released as part of a six-song EP in November 2004 and was also featured on her 2005 album Wikked Lil' Grrrls. The song lyrically explores the lack of originality in current popular music, decrying several popular performers, including Ashanti and Britney Spears.

Upon its release, the song received almost unanimous praise from critics, who compared Esthero's vocal performance to Bjork's and praised the track's outspokenness and production. An accompanying music video was shot in Toronto and released, receiving play on MuchMusic.

To promote the song, an EP of the same name was released by Reprise Records in November 2004. It featured collaborations with Sean Lennon and Cee-Lo and garnered unanimous praise from critics, who praised the release's eclecticism and regarded the title track as a highlight.

Background and writing
Esthero had been dropped from Work Group Records in 1999, when it was absorbed into Epic Records. She subsequently signed with Reprise Records and worked on a number of collaborations and soundtrack contributions before commencing recording for her second album in the early 2000s. Due to a series of delays, "We R In Need of a Musical Revolution" wasn't released until late 2005, making some of the lyrics sound dated. In an interview with The Washington Post, she stated that "When I wrote it, the Ashanti comment ("No matter where I go, I see Ashanti on the video screen") was relevant," but that "by the time we mixed (the song), I was secretly hoping she would resurface with something so that my statement would be relevant!" Ashanti returned to the spotlight as a spokeswoman for Herbal Essence, and Esthero admits that "Secretly I was going, 'Yes, now my song makes sense!'"

Esthero told Billboard that she chose to have the song as the opening track on Wikked Lil' Grrrls because it "made everything make sense. I felt that if I make it the first track on the record, people would understand why I do so much genre-hopping and why the album is so manic. It just puts a nice little bow on the record."

Composition
Lyrically, the song explores the lack of originality in current popular music. Esthero references a number of musicians and pop-culture events in the song. Some of these include:
 Ashanti ("No matter where I go, I see Ashanti in the video")
 MTV ("And MTV they only play the same thing")
 Britney Spears ("No matter where I go, I see Britney on my video screen")
 R. Kelly ("Tell me why a grown man can rape a little girl, but we still hear his shit on our radio")

Critical reception
The song garnered mostly favorable reviews from music critics, with many comparing the song to Björk's music. Johnny Loftus, writing for AllMusic, felt that the song was a highlight of both the EP and the album and stated that the song "updates the sound of Esthero's 1998 debut with propulsive programming and more Björk in her vocal than ever before." Mark Saleski, writing for Blog Critics, was similarly-positive, calling the song "sassy" and "funny". Slant Magazine's Sal Cinquemani likewise praised the track, commenting that its lyrics "justly lambaste radio for its repetitive playlists and MTV for what they're now calling the 'Big 10.'"

However, Annie Zaleski, writing for the Cleveland Scene, held the opposite view. She felt that the song was the weakest track on the EP, calling it "weak" and "whiny".

Music video
A music video, directed by Noble Jones, was released, and features Esthero destroying televisions and performing on a busy street. The city and street scenes were shot in Toronto, Ontario. The video was premiered in June 2005, and was aired on MuchMusic.

EP

A six-track EP of the same name was released by Reprise to promote the song, and in anticipation of her second full-length album, which the label predicted would be released in early 2005. Three of the tracks, including the title track, were later included on her second full-length album, Wikked Lil' Grrrls.

Track listing
"We R in Need of a Musical Revolution!" – 4:04
"Everyday Is a Holiday with You" – 4:02
"Gone" – 5:11
"This Lull-a-bye" – 5:30
"I Drive Alone" – 3:40
"Amber & the Tiger's Eye" – 7:28 (bonus track)

Critical reception
The EP garnered highly positive reviews. AllMusic notes the EP as a career highlight for Esthero. Allmusic's Johnny Loftus awarded the EP three and a half out of five stars, likening Esthero's vocal performance to Bjork's and praising the EP's stylistic range, noting "Gone" as the EP's best song. Annie Zaleski, writing for Cleveland Scene, was also positive, commenting that the EP demonstrates Esthero's "musical growth" and noting the album's stylistic eclecticism. She had mixed feelings, however, regarding the title track, and commented that "tidying up her once-messy mash-ups produces songs that just aren't very interesting."

References

External links
View the music video on YouTube

Esthero songs
2004 singles
2004 songs
2004 EPs
Songs about music
Songs written by Esthero